Yasko or Jasko (Cyrillic: Ясько) is a gender-neutral Slavic surname that may refer to the following notable people:
 Brett Yasko, American graphic designer
Tomáš Jasko (born 1983), Slovak ice hockey player
Yelyzaveta Yasko (born 1990), Ukrainian politician and film producer

See also
 

Ukrainian-language surnames